Gary Stevens may refer to:

 Gary Stevens (American football) (born 1943), former American football coach
 Gary Stevens (Australian rules footballer) (born 1972), former Sydney Swans player
 Gary Stevens (footballer, born 1954) English footballer, played for Cardiff City and Shrewsbury Town
 Gary Stevens (footballer, born 1962) English footballer, played for Brighton and Tottenham
 Gary Stevens (footballer, born 1963) English footballer, played for Everton and Rangers
 Gary Stevens (jockey) (born 1963), American jockey
 Gary Stevens (politician) (born 1941), Alaska State Senator  
 Gary Stevens (radio), American disc jockey in the 1960s for WMCA and Swinging Radio England
 Gary Stevens (rugby league) (born 1944), Australian rugby league footballer